Nasutitermes lacustris, is a species of termite of the genus Nasutitermes. It is found in India and Sri Lanka. This species builds nests on branches of forest trees and can be found in stems of trees like Anacardium, Hevea and ''Elaeocarpus.

References

External links
A comprehensive phylogenetic analysis of termites (Isoptera) illuminates key aspects of their evolutionary biology
Isoptera
Treatise on the isoptera of the world

Termites
Insects described in 1912
Arthropods of India